His Sudden Recovery is a 1914 American short silent comedy film directed by Arthur Hotaling featuring Oliver Hardy.

Plot

Cast
 Oliver Hardy as Mr. Jones (as Babe Hardy)
 Eloise Willard as Mrs. Jones
 Frances Ne Moyer as Their daughter
 Marguerite Ne Moyer as The Maid
 Julia Calhoun as The Trained Nurse

See also
 List of American films of 1914
 Oliver Hardy filmography

External links

1914 films
1914 short films
American silent short films
American black-and-white films
1914 comedy films
Films directed by Arthur Hotaling
Silent American comedy films
American comedy short films
1910s American films